Richard Eakin may refer to:

Richard M. Eakin (1910–1999), American zoologist
Richard R. Eakin (born 1938), chancellor of East Carolina University